Stamperland is a suburban neighbourhood in Clarkston, East Renfrewshire, Scotland.

Location and demography
Stamperland is an area of Clarkston, to the south of Glasgow. Adjacent places are Netherlee to the north and the rest of Clarkston to the south. It is bordered by Clarkston Road to the west, the railway to the south and the White Cart Water to the east. It is served by the Glasgow Central to East Kilbride line through Clarkston railway station at the south of the area.

The area is mainly housing dating from the 1920s and early 1930s, previously farmland under the farms of Stamperland (around The Oval today), Slamanshill (around Stamperland Avenue) and Overlee, which still exists today in the Overlee Park. but there is a small group of local shops located at the junction of Clarkston Road, Stamperland Crescent and Stamperland Gardens. Also at this location is the former Stamperland Parish Church (Church of Scotland). Other local facilities include a social club, bowling and tennis clubs. The area also contains the large Overlee Park, which is home to multiple football pitches, and a large children's playground.

For census purposes, Stamperland is classified as a separate locality within the settlement of Greater Glasgow, within the East Renfrewshire council area; however, for most other purposes it is considered to be a part of the town of Clarkston. The most recent estimate, from mid-2012, gives a population of 3,610.

Landmarks
 
The Stamperland Parish Church is a former church, opened between 1964 and 2022, a modern-style building with a concrete bell tower. Services had previously been held in temporary accommodation since the founding of the congregation in 1940. The congregation merged with the nearby Netherlee Parish Church in 2020. The congregation voted 77% to 19% to permanently close Stamperland Church on 20 February 2022. The final service took place on 26 June 2022, and the building was placed up for sale by the church.

Overlee Playing Fields is a park situated on Moray Drive in the southeast of the neighbourhood. The park is steep, like much of Stamperland, with many cliffs. It contains four football pitches. In the early 1800s, the remains of a village of underground dwellings (souterrains or weems) from around 2000 years earlier was uncovered by the local landowner preparing the ground for use as a quarry, but its significance was not recognised and the evidence was destroyed. The park's pavilion was abandoned for around five years after large amounts of bats made their home there. The local authority in 2018 announced plans for a replacement building (including a small nursery and a house for the bats) that would be built on an adjacent site. The new building was built, and opened in 2021, and the pavilion was demolished.

References

External links

Suburbs in East Renfrewshire
Greater Glasgow
Clarkston, East Renfrewshire